Blue Water Dokken is a multi-purpose indoor arena in Esbjerg, Denmark. Its best known tenant is the women's handball club Team Esbjerg, one of the top teams of the Danish championship, that also regularly plays in Europe, having reached the EHF Cup final in 2014. Beside handball it also hosts other indoor sports as well as concerts, shows and others.

References
 

Esbjerg
Indoor arenas in Denmark
Handball venues in Denmark
Music venues in Denmark
Buildings and structures in Esbjerg